John Luther is the central character in TV series Luther.

John Luther may also refer to:
John Luther (MP) (c. 1739-86), Member of the Parliament of Great Britain for Essex 
John Luther (basketball), member of 1923 NCAA Men's Basketball All-Americans
John Luther (captain) (died 1645), mariner in New England, family connection of Robert Abell 
John Luther, an upcoming Indian film in Malayalam language.

See also
Jon L. Luther, American businessman